"Brachyglene" thirmida is a moth of the family Notodontidae first described by Hering in 1925. It is found in Bolivia.

Adults resemble Scea species. Morphological traits demonstrate that wing-pattern resemblance in this case is a result of convergent evolution, perhaps attributable to Müllerian mimicry.

Taxonomy
The species does not belong in Brachyglene, but has not been placed in another genus yet.

References

Moths described in 1925
Notodontidae of South America